The following is a family tree of the emperors of Japan, from the legendary Emperor Jimmu to the present monarch, Naruhito.

Modern scholars have come to question the existence of at least the first nine emperors; Kōgen's descendant, Emperor Sujin (98 BC – 30 BC?), is the first for whom many agree that he might have actually existed. These monarchs are regarded by historians as "legendary emperors", since there is insufficient material available for further verification and study.

The reign of Emperor Kinmei ( – 571 AD), the 29th emperor, is the first for which the contemporary historiography is able to assign verifiable dates. However, the conventionally accepted names and dates of the early emperors were not to be confirmed as "traditional" until the reign of Emperor Kanmu (737–806), the 50th sovereign of the Yamato dynasty.

See also 
 Succession to the Japanese throne
 Family Tree of Japanese deities
 Fushimi-no-miya#Family Tree showing the family tree of the potentially future royal family if laws were changed

Notelist

References 
General

Specific

Japanese
Descent from antiquity
Dynasty genealogy

Japan history-related lists
Lists of Japanese people